Boeckella bispinosa is a species of calanoid copepod in the family Centropagidae.

The IUCN conservation status of Boeckella bispinosa is "VU", vulnerable. The species faces a high risk of endangerment in the medium term. The IUCN status was reviewed in 1996.

References

Centropagidae
Articles created by Qbugbot
Crustaceans described in 1967